Rampachodavaram revenue division (or Rampachodavaram division) is an administrative division in the Alluri Sitharama Raju district of the Indian state of Andhra Pradesh. It is one of the three revenue divisions in the district which consists of seven mandals under its administration. Rampachodavaram is the divisional headquarters.

Administration 
There are 7 mandals in Rampachodavaram revenue division.

See also 
List of revenue divisions in Andhra Pradesh
List of mandals in Andhra Pradesh

References 

Revenue divisions in Alluri Sitharama Raju district